Pazhani is a 1965 Indian Tamil-language drama film directed by A. Bhimsingh. The film stars Sivaji Ganesan, S. S. Rajendran, R. Muthuraman and Devika. It was released on 14 January 1965. The film was a critical success and won the National Film Award for Best Feature Film in Tamil under the Certificate of Merit category. It is a remake of the 1962 Kannada film Bhoodana.

Plot

Cast 
Sivaji Ganesan as Pazhani
S. S. Rajendran as Raju
R. Muthuraman as Muthu
T. S. Balaiah as Pannaiyar
Devika as Kaveri
M. R. Radha
Nagesh as Sandhanam
Sriram as Velu
Pushpalatha as Emily
Sivakami as Velu's wife

Production 
Pazhani does not have any actors credited in the opening titles; it only displays the credits of technicians.

Soundtrack 
The soundtrack was composed by Viswanathan–Ramamoorthy. Kannadasan wrote the song "Annan Ennada" at a time when he believed his brothers had abandoned him.
Aarodum Mannil – T. M. Soundararajan, Sirkazhi Govindarajan, P. B. Srinivas
Annan Ennada – T. M. Soundararajan
Ullathukkule – P. Susheela, T. M. Soundararajan
Vatta Vatta – Sirkazhi Govindarajan, P. Susheela
Idhayam Irukkindrathe – T. M. Soundararajan
Annachi – Sirkazhi Govindarajan, T. M. Soundararajan, S. C. Krishnan, A. L. Raghavan, K. R. S. Samy, L. R. Eswari

Release and reception 
Pazhani was released on 14 January 1965. T. M. Ramachandran in Sport and Pastime wrote, "The slow pace at which the story progresses takes away much from the film’s quality and appeal but one cannot, while making a true art film, avoid this in depicting the humdrum life of a peasant and his family". The film received the National Film Award for Best Feature Film in Tamil under the Certificate of Merit category.

References

Bibliography

External links 
 

1960s Tamil-language films
1965 drama films
1965 films
Films directed by A. Bhimsingh
Films scored by Viswanathan–Ramamoorthy
Indian black-and-white films
Indian drama films
Tamil remakes of Kannada films